Susie Liggat is a British television and film producer and executive producer. She has worked in independent film and high end television drama as well as working as Head of Physical Production at the UK Film Council. 

She is currently the series producer for the upcoming Netflix drama, Bodies, an eight part miniseries based on Si Spencer's graphic novel with the same title.

Career 
Her career had previously been as a first assistant director, in which capacity she worked on popular series such as Teachers, Black Books, and Casanova, until she became a producer in 2006.

She produced Invasion of the Bane, the pilot episode of The Sarah Jane Adventures, a spin-off from Doctor Who, on which she had worked as a first assistant director.

During the production of the third series of Doctor Who, Liggat produced one filming block (the two-parter "Human Nature"/"The Family of Blood") as holiday relief for regular producer Phil Collinson. Liggat produced five episodes of the fourth series: "Planet of the Ood", "The Sontaran Strategem", "The Poison Sky", "The Unicorn and the Wasp" and "Turn Left".  She also produced the 2008 Christmas special, entitled "The Next Doctor".

She has produced Blood and Oil for BBC2 - a 2 x 90 mini drama set in the Nigerian Delta Oil fields, House of Anubis, The Cafe x 2, Sherlock, and in 2014 she produced Mapp and Lucia for BBC One Most Recently - 'You, me and the Apocalypse' for NBC / Sky.

Filmography

As producer

As First Assistant Director

As Executive Producer 

BBC television producers
British women television producers
Living people
Year of birth missing (living people)

References